Nachalo is a rural locality (a settlement) and the administrative center of Novopostoyalovskoye Rural Settlement, Rossoshansky District, Voronezh Oblast, Russia. The population was 1,832 as of 2010. There are 33 streets.

Geography 
Nachalo is located 6 km north of Rossosh (the district's administrative centre) by road. Rossosh is the nearest rural locality.

References 

Rural localities in Rossoshansky District